Impruneta is a town and comune of the Metropolitan City of Florence in the Italian region of Tuscany. The population is about 15,000.

Name and production
The name Impruneta is derived from inprunetis meaning "within the pine woods", and is known for its fine production of terracotta. The terracotta is made from local clay, has a red-colored finish, and production includes everything from small tiles to large garden vases and statues.

Main sights
The most important feature of Impruneta is the Sanctuary of Santa Maria. The Basilica dates from 1060, being probably located over an ancient devotional site of Etruscan times (6th century BC). It was an important site of pilgrimage during the Middle Ages.

The basilica was bombed during World War II and now few of the original decorations can be seen. The façade is preceded by  a portico by Gherardo Silvani (1634), built by the Florentine people as vow for the liberation from the plague, and by a bell tower from the 13th century. The interior has a single nave; artworks include a Nativity by Domenico Passignano and a Vocation of St. Peter by Jacopo da Empoli. The presbytery is flanked by two niches by Michelozzo decorated by Luca della Robbia, housing the relics of the Holy Cross and the Madonna's image to which the sanctuary is devoted and, which, according to tradition, was painted by St. Luke himself.

The museum connected to the basilica is home to one of the oldest-known pieces of European patchwork, the so-called Impruneta Cushion, dating from the late 14th or early 15th centuries.  The cushion belonged to Bishop Antonio degli Agli, priest in charge of Santa Maria dell'Impruneta from 1439 to his death in 1477, and was found in his tomb after the church was damaged by an Allied bomb in 1944.

The current Madonna's image is a heavy restoration by Ignazio Hugford from 1758.

Also in Impruneta are the churches of San Lorenzo alle Rose and Santo Stefano a Pozzolatico.

Town saint
The town's saint is St. Luc and the saint's feast day on 18 October each year is the highlight of a week-long festival with a Palio featuring horse racing a carnival and fireworks.

Twin towns
 Prachatice, Czech Republic
 Bellerive-sur-Allier, France
 Hadamar, Germany
 Pruszków, Poland

Notable residents
Ermanno Picchi (1811–1856), composer, pedagogue and music critic
Alessandro Pieroni (1550–1607), architect and painter
Gustavo Uzielli (1839-1911), geologist, historian, and scientist
Marco Masini (1964), singer-songwriter, pianist

References

External links
 Official website
 Official Tourist Website